Jesse Bonnell is an American artist whose work combines installation, video, photography, drawing and performance. He is a co-founder and director of Poor Dog Group, a Los Angeles-based collective dedicated to contemporary performance. His work germinates within visual art vocabularies, cinema, subverted theaterical idioms, non-hierarchal collaboration and lab-like experimentation.

Nationally, Bonnell's work has been shown at REDCAT, Museum of Contemporary Art Santa Barbara, RADAR L.A., South Coast Repertory, Bootleg Theater, The Getty Villa, EMPAC and other site-specific locations. His project Group Therapy will debut at Center for the Art of Performance, UCLA in June 2018.

Bonnell graduated from the California Institute of the Arts and has received support from Theater Communications Group, Foundation for Contemporary Art, United States Embassy Belgrade, Los Angeles County Arts Commission, Center for Cultural Innovation, and a Cultural Exchange International Grant from the City of Los Angeles Department of Cultural Affairs and Creative Capital.

References 

Year of birth missing (living people)
Living people
California Institute of the Arts alumni
American multimedia artists